The 1999 Rhode Island Rams football team was an American football team that represented the University of Rhode Island in the Atlantic 10 Conference during the 1999 NCAA Division I-AA football season. In their seventh and last season under head coach Floyd Keith, the Rams compiled a 1–10 record (1–7 against conference opponents) and tied for last place in the New England Division of the conference.

Schedule

References

Rhode Island
Rhode Island Rams football seasons
Rhode Island Rams football